Yuri Borisovich Agapov (born 27 June 1980) is a former Russian professional footballer.

Club career
Agapov played 3 seasons in the Russian Football National League for FC Fakel Voronezh and FC Oryol. He also played in the Kazakhstan Premier League with FC Shakhter Karagandy and FC Irtysh Pavlodar.

References

1980 births
Footballers from Moscow
Living people
Russian footballers
Association football midfielders
FC Torpedo-2 players
FC Tom Tomsk players
FC Fakel Voronezh players
FC Irtysh Pavlodar players
FC Shakhter Karagandy players
FC Volga Nizhny Novgorod players
FC Oryol players
FC Torpedo Moscow players
Kazakhstan Premier League players
Russian expatriate footballers
Expatriate footballers in Kazakhstan
Russian expatriate sportspeople in Kazakhstan
FC Dynamo Makhachkala players